Bruce Stephen Flegg (born 10 March 1954, Sydney) is a former Australian politician. He was a member of the Queensland Legislative Assembly from 2004 to 2015, representing the electorate of Moggill in south-western Brisbane for the Liberal Party and its successor the Liberal National Party. He was the leader of the state Liberal Party from 2006 to 2007 and served as Minister for Housing and Public Works in the Newman government from April to November 2012.

Early life
Flegg was born in Sydney and was a general practitioner before entering politics. Flegg completed a post graduate diploma in Financial Markets, winning the Queensland Investment Corporation prize for industrial equity analysis.

Political career
He contested the seat of Petrie at the 1990 federal election, and in 1993 he contested the seat of Dickson which was ultimately delayed to a supplementary election due to the death of a candidate, but was defeated by the Labor candidate, Michael Lavarch. He was elected to the Legislative Assembly at the 2004 state election, replacing former Liberal leader David Watson in the safe Liberal seat of Moggill. He was immediately elected deputy leader of the Liberal Party upon his election, and succeeded Bob Quinn as leader in 2006.

Leader of the Liberals (2006–07)
He had only been Liberal leader for a number of days when then-Premier Peter Beattie called the 2006 state election, which the conservative parties lost decisively. He faced wide criticism in the wake of the election defeat regarding his performance during the campaign, and faced speculation of a challenge from rival Tim Nicholls. Nicholls was unable to gain sufficient support to oust Flegg in a closely divided caucus, but following ongoing tension, Flegg resigned as leader on 4 December 2007 and was succeeded by compromise candidate Mark McArdle.

LNP Frontbench (2009–12)
Flegg was not part of the initial shadow ministry following the merger of the Liberal Party and National Party to form the Liberal National Party in 2008, but was subsequently appointed Shadow Minister for Education in 2009. He was appointed Minister for Housing and Public Works under Campbell Newman following the party's landslide victory at the 2012 state election; however, he resigned in November following a series of controversies surrounding his ministerial dealings with his lobbyist son and allegations he had moonlighted as a GP while a minister.

Post Resignation (2012–15)
Following his resignation, Dr Flegg filed a defamation case against the source of the allegations, media advisor Graham Hallett. The case concluded with Dr Flegg winning the defamation action, successfully demonstrating that Hallett had defamed Dr Flegg and caused him significant material detriment due to the loss of his role as a minister. At a total of $775,000, the sum of damages awarded to Dr Flegg was the largest ever recorded for a defamation case in Queensland legal history.

In October 2014, the LNP State Executive refused to support Dr Flegg's party preselection as a candidate for the January 2015 election, instead choosing to replace him with former AMA President Dr. Christian Rowan. He remained an LNP Member of Parliament until the January 2015 election when he did not re-contest his seat. There was some speculation that Newman could transfer from his marginal seat of Ashgrove to Moggill after Flegg was denied preselection. Moggill was the safest LNP seat in Brisbane; at the time, the LNP sat on a majority of 23.9 percent. However, Newman ruled out a transfer.

Personal
He has three sons, one of whom, Jonathon Flegg, ran unsuccessfully for the New South Wales Legislative Assembly beachside seat of Coogee in 2007.

References

External links 
 Parliamentary biography
 Official site
 StackPath
 Case Law, Australia: Dr Bruce Flegg v Graeme Hallett, Massive damages for career destroying political defamation – Yvonne Kux

1954 births
Liberal Party of Australia members of the Parliament of Queensland
Liberal National Party of Queensland politicians
Living people
Members of the Queensland Legislative Assembly
Politicians from Sydney
21st-century Australian politicians
Deputy opposition leaders